Hummel may refer to:

People
 Hummel (surname), origin and list of people with the surname Hummel

Companies
 Hummel International, a Denmark-based sporting goods and apparel company
 Hummel figurines
 Hummel Aviation, American aircraft manufacturer based in Bryan, Ohio
 Hummel Ultracruiser, an American amateur-built aircraft
 Hummel Bird, an American amateur-built aircraft

Geography
 Lordship of Hummel, historic landscape zone, now in Silesia, Poland
 Hummel Field, a public use airport in Middlesex County, Virginia, United States
 Hummel, Kentucky, a community in the United States
 Mount Hummel, a summit of Grant Island, off the coast of Marie Byrd Land, Antarctica
 Hümmel, municipality in the district of Ahrweiler, in Rhineland-Palatinate, Germany

Other
 Hummels, an alien species in the Ron Goulart novel Shaggy Planet
 Hummel (instrument), a musical instrument
 Siebel Si 202 Hummel, a German light sportsplane of the late 1930s
 Hummel, a male morph of red deer with no antlers, also known as a nott
 Hummel, a name for dehulled barley grain; the process was called hummelling and mechanical devices used for this process were originally known as barley hummellers (now called hullers)
 Hummel (vehicle), a German self-propelled artillery vehicle used in World War II

See also 
 Mats Hummels (born 1988), German footballer
 Hummels Wharf, Pennsylvania
 Hummelstown, Pennsylvania, a town named after its founders, Frederick and Rosina Hummel